In the 2020–21 season, Stal Stalowa Wola competed in III liga, group IV and the regional Polish Cup. In addition, they competed in the season's edition of the central Polish Cup. The season covered the period from 9 August 2020 to 26 June 2021.

Season overview

2020
This is the first season of Stal Stalowa Wola after their relegation from II liga. On 9 August 2020, Piotr Witasik was announced the team captain for the 2020–21 season.

The first match of the season, on 9 August, ended in a Polish Cup's 3–1 victory against Skra Częstochowa. Stal Stalowa Wola were knocked out of the 2020–21 Polish Cup exactly ten days later, after losing 0–4 against the Ekstraklasa club Lechia Gdańsk at the Podkarpackie Centrum Piłki Nożnej. On 23 August, Stal secured their first league win of the season by defeating Wólczanka Wólka Pełkińska 4–3 in a home game, with goals from Michał Fidziukiewicz twice, Adam Waszkiewicz and Szymon Jarosz.

The first Great Subcarpathian Derby against Siarka Tarnobrzeg on 26 September ended in a 4–1 away victory, with goals from Filip Szifer, Michał Fidziukiewicz twice and Volodymyr Khorolskyi. From 17 October, due to the COVID-19 pandemic restrictions, all Stal's football matches have been played behind closed doors without any spectators. On 31 October, after a 0–3 loss to Wisła Puławy, Szymon Szydełko was released from his contract (at the time of his release, Stal was sixth, 18 points behind to first place). On 4 November Jaromir Wieprzęć was announced as his successor. On 8 November he made his debut in a 0–1 defeat against Sokół Sieniawa. In December seven Stal Stalowa Wola players (Piotr Witasik, Szymon Jarosz, Rafał Surmiak, Piotr Zmorzyński, Michał Płonka, Michał Fidziukiewicz and Tomasz Płonka) were placed on a transfer list by the club.

2021
The new year started with a 1–0 home victory against Avia Świdnik, the only goal was scored by Tomasz Płonka. In the second game of the year, they suffered their first defeat against Podlasie Biała Podlaska 1–2. After two more unfortunate defeats, Stal's coach Jaromir Wieprzęć received an ultimatum, according to which he would resign if he had not won three consecutive matches in III liga. After winning one match against Jutrzenka Giebułtów, Stal lost to Korona Kielce II 0–1. Jaromir Wieprzęć was dismissed on 12 April, and in the next match against Hetman Zamość he was replaced by his assistant Damian Skakuj.

In the last league match of the season, Stal drew 2–2 with Podhale Nowy Targ, falling to the fourth place in the final classification of the season. On26 June 2021, Stal lost the final of the Subcarpathian Polish Cup to Wisłoka Dębica, losing the chance to participate in the 2021–22 Polish Cup's central edition.

Players

° symbol applies for players who joined the club during the season or in the pre-season term.
° symbol applies for players who left the club during the season or in the summer transfer window term, but had made at least one regular-season appearance.

Transfers

In

Out

Coaching staff

Friendlies

Competitions

Overview

III liga, group IV

Standings

Results summary

Matches

Polish Cup

Central level

Regional level (group: Subcarpathian Football Association – Stalowa Wola)

Regional level (group: Subcarpathian Football Association)

Statistics

Goalscorers

III liga

‡ Player left the club mid-season

Polish Cup

Hat-tricks

(H) – Home ; (A) – Away

Other teams

Reserve team
Stal Stalowa Wola II competed in the IV liga Subcarpathia. In the end, Stal II got relegated to the regional league.

Overview

Juniors U-15
Stal Stalowa Wola U-15 competed in the Subcarpathian group, as they won the competition after a 12–1 victory over Karpaty Krosno. In the U-15 Central Junior League play-off, they drew 5–5 (2–2 away, 3–3 a.e.t. home) in aggregate to Unia Tarnów (Lesser Poland group winners) and eventually dropped out of the competition due to the away goals rule.

Overview

U-15 Central Junior League play-off matches

Notes

References

Stal Stalowa Wola seasons
Stal Stalowa Wola